Pavel Ryabinin (born 8 April 1971) is a Kazakhstani cross-country skier who competed from 1994 to 2002. His best World Cup finish was 18th at a 15 km race in Italy in 1994.

Ryabinin also competed in three Winter Olympics, earning his best finish of 13th in the 30 km at Nagano in 1998. His best finish at the FIS Nordic World Ski Championships was 20th in the 10 km + 15 km combined pursuit event at Ramsau in 1999.

References
FIS-Ski.com profile

1971 births
Cross-country skiers at the 1994 Winter Olympics
Cross-country skiers at the 1998 Winter Olympics
Cross-country skiers at the 2002 Winter Olympics
Kazakhstani male cross-country skiers
Olympic cross-country skiers of Kazakhstan
Living people
Asian Games medalists in cross-country skiing
Cross-country skiers at the 1996 Asian Winter Games
Cross-country skiers at the 1999 Asian Winter Games
Asian Games gold medalists for Kazakhstan
Asian Games silver medalists for Kazakhstan
Medalists at the 1996 Asian Winter Games
Medalists at the 1999 Asian Winter Games
20th-century Kazakhstani people
21st-century Kazakhstani people